Baharan (previously known as Goshnekan) is a village in Kaftarak Rural District, in the Central District of Shiraz County, Fars Province, Iran. At the 2016 census, its population was 2,178 in 644 families.

References 

Populated places in Shiraz County